Hornet La Frappe is a French rapper of Algerian descent from Epinay-sur-Seine, Seine-Saint-Denis, in the northern suburbs of Paris. He started rapping in 2012 and released his first mixtape Réussir ou Mounir in 2014 and the follow-up mixtape Nous-mêmes on 29 September 2017. "Gramme 2 Peuf" was his first big success as a single

Discography

Studio albums

Mixtapes

Singles

*Did not appear in the official Belgian Ultratop 50 charts, but rather in the bubbling under Ultratip charts.

Featured in

*Did not appear in the official Belgian Ultratop 50 charts, but rather in the bubbling under Ultratip charts.

Other charting songs

*Did not appear in the official Belgian Ultratop 50 charts, but rather in the bubbling under Ultratip charts.

References

External links
Official website

French rappers
Living people
French people of Algerian descent
Rappers from Seine-Saint-Denis
1992 births